Wayne Phillips may refer to:

 Wayne B. Phillips (born 1958), South Australian cricketer who played 27 Tests and 48 One Day Internationals for Australia
 Wayne N. Phillips (born 1962), Victorian cricketer who played one Test for Australia
 Wayne Phillips (politician) (born 1952), Australian politician
 Waynne Phillips (born 1970), Welsh footballer

See also
 Wayne Phillip (born 1977), West Indian cricketer